G36  may refer to:
 Beechcraft G36 Bonanza, an American aircraft
 G36 Nanjing–Luoyang Expressway, in China
 Glock 36, an Austrian pistol 
 Grumman G-36, a F4F Wildcat aircraft variant
 Heckler & Koch G36, a German assault rifle
 Kami language (Tanzania)
 Matsuchi Station, in Ehime Prefecture, Japan